David Marshall Trout (born November 12, 1957) is a former kicker who played professional American football in the National Football League for the Pittsburgh Steelers in 1981 and 1987. He also played for the Philadelphia/Baltimore Stars of the United States Football League from 1983 through 1985, helping the club win back-to-back league titles in 1984 and 1985.

Personal
While born in Mount Pleasant, Pennsylvania, Trout lived much of his early life in Bolivia where his parents were missionaries. Here he conditioned his leg, playing soccer at the age of 12. After retiring from football, Trout worked as a missionary, building homes in Florida and then went into Youth Ministry where he was a Youth Pastor at St. Johns church in Turnersville, New Jersey. In 1994, he attended Piedmont College in North Carolina where he received an Airframe and Powerplant license to build and fly aircraft. He then used his degree to become a bush pilot, to bring supplies to the Mexican people and to preach the Gospel. To do this Trout would have to fly in and out of Mexico, landing the small plane in areas that were often held by Mexican drug lords. The air strips were in mountainous regions and extremely small to land the planes. After leaving the mission, he returned to New Jersey and built houses in the area as a contractor. He now serves in Bolivia where he grew up working with mechanics on airplanes and inspecting.

Career stats

References

External links

Pittsburgh Panthers football players
Pittsburgh Steelers players
Philadelphia/Baltimore Stars players
Players of American football from Pennsylvania
People from Westmoreland County, Pennsylvania
1957 births
American football placekickers
Living people
National Football League replacement players